The 66th New York Infantry Regiment (or National Guard Rifles) was an infantry regiment in the Union Army during the American Civil War.

Service
The 66th New York Infantry was organized at New York City, New York and mustered in for three years service on November 4, 1861, under the command of Colonel Joseph C. Pinckney.

The regiment was attached to Graham's Brigade, Buell's Division, Army of the Potomac, to January 1862. French's Brigade, Sumner's Division, Army of the Potomac, to March 1862. 3rd Brigade, 1st Division, II Corps, to March 1864. 4th Brigade, 1st Division, II Corps, to May 1865. Fort Richardson, New York, to August 1865.

The 66th New York Infantry mustered out of service August 30, 1865.

Detailed service
The 66th, the "Governor's Guard," was the outgrowth of the 6th Militia, recruited mainly in New York City, and was mustered into the U. S. service at New York, November 4, 1861, for a three-year term. It left New York for Washington, November 16, 1861, was assigned to Graham's Brigade, Buell's Division, until January 1862, when it became a part of French's Brigade, Sumner's Division, which became in March, the 3rd Brigade, 1st Division, II Corps, Army of the Potomac. It reached the Peninsula in time to be present during the latter part of the siege of Yorktown; was active at Fair Oaks and during the Seven Days Battles, but suffered its most severe loss at Antietam, where 103 were killed, wounded, or captured, among them Chaplain Dwight, who was in the midst of the fight. The 66th proceeded through Charlestown, West Virginia, and Snicker's Gap, to Fredericksburg, where it lost 75 in killed, wounded, and missing out of 238 engaged. It was then in the 3rd (Zook's) Brigade of Hancock's division, which also suffered severely at Chancellorsville, the loss of the 66th being 70 men. II Corps continued to see arduous service through the hard-fought field of Gettysburg and the actions at Auburn and Bristoe Station, the last being a II Corps engagement. After the Mine Run movement the regiment went into winter quarters with the Army of the Potomac and when the spring campaign opened, was assigned to the 4th Brigade of its old division. In Grant's campaign in the Wilderness the heaviest losses of the 66th were suffered during the first week, but it continued in active service through Cold Harbor, where Col. Morris, commanding the brigade was killed, and the Siege of Petersburg, losing heavily in the first assault on the fortifications. In the autumn of 1864 the original members not reenlisted were mustered out and the reenlisted men and recruits remained at the front as a veteran organization. After the fall of Petersburg the regiment was ordered to Fort Richmond, New York Harbor, and there remained until August 30.

Casualties
The regiment lost a total of 221 men during service; 9 officers and 88 enlisted men killed or mortally wounded, 4 officers and 120 enlisted men died of disease.

Commanders
 Colonel Joseph C. Pinckney
 Colonel Orlando H. Morris - wounded in action at the Battle of Gettysburg, July 2; killed in action at the Battle of Cold Harbor while leading 4th Brigade, First Division, II Corps
 Colonel John S. Hammell - commanded at the Battle of Gettysburg as lieutenant colonel after Col Morris was wounded; also wounded on July 2
 Major Peter A. Nelson - commanded at the Battle of Gettysburg after Ltc Hammell was wounded
 Captain Julius Wehle - commanded at the Battle of Antietam
 Captain Nathaniel P. Lane - commanded at the First Battle of Deep Bottom

In popular culture
 In the 2017 film The Beguiled the film's protagonist, Corporal John McBurney (played by actor Colin Farrel) is a member of the 66th Regiment who finds refuge in a woman's boarding school in Virginia.

See also

 List of New York Civil War regiments
 New York in the Civil War

References
 Dyer, Frederick H. A Compendium of the War of the Rebellion (Des Moines, IA:  Dyer Pub. Co.), 1908.

References

External links
 Surviving guidon of the 66th New York Infantry
 66th New York Infantry Monument at Gettysburg

Military units and formations established in 1861
Military units and formations disestablished in 1865
Infantry 066
1861 establishments in New York (state)